Yurii Hudymenko (Ukrainian: Юрій Володимирович Гудименко) (born December 14, 1987, Zaporizhzhia, Ukrainian SSR) is a Ukrainian politician. He is leader of the "Demokratychna Sokyra" movement.He participated in the Russo-Ukrainian War as commander of a military engineer detachment, and junior sergeant. He had been a political prisoner, journalist and blogger.

He holds a degree in history with teaching qualification.

He appeared in videos of anti-war pro-Ukrainian position.

Activism 
 In 2008 he became involved in activism and the political process.
 In 2010 he served as deputy head of a political party in Zaporizhzhia.
 In 2011 he was sentenced to two years in prison (sentence suspended) for defacing the monument to Dzerzhynsky with a bucket of paint (Dzerzhynski was one of the founders of the All-Russian Extraordinary Commission (Cheka) and organizer of the "Red Terror").
 In 2016–2017 he headed the campaign department for a Ukrainian political party. He was an aide to the leader of the Zaporizhzhia Euromaidan.
 As a participant in Euromaidan rallies in Zaporizhzhia, he was beaten up during January 26, 2014, violent dispersal of the protest by the police.
 In 2014 he initiated the "Operation Butterfly" website – one of the first databases containing information on separatists.

Political activity 
In Spring 2018 he became a co-founded the Demokratychna Sokyra political party. He organized rallies ("The 11% March") in Kyiv. He was the organizer of several anti-Russian and anti-Communist party events, including the "Immortal Orc" on May 9, 2018, and parody "wakes" under Russian Federation Embassy in Kyiv after the deaths of Kobzon and Zakharchenko (a terrorist). Gudymenko supports a strong army, policies independent of Russia, deregulation of the economy, taxation reform and business rights.

Journalist 
 In 2011 he worked as a journalist for Subota Plus local Zaporizhzhia newspaper.
 In 2012 he served as head for the news department of the regional "TV-Gold" TV channel.
 In 2013 he worked as editor in chief for Mriya newspaper
 He authored a number of investigative pieces.
 In 2016 he became the co-founder of the Forpost news website
 In 2015 he moved to Kyiv, where he worked briefly with TSN, Focus, Petro and Mazepa and other news outlets. He volunteered for a weekly historical radio program on military "Armiya. FM" radio.
 In 2018–2019 he worked as anchor for Blogpost and Blogpost: Hate Night Show TV program.

Russo-Ukrainian War involvement 
After the 2022 Russian invasion Gudymenko enlisted. He served as a military engineer (sapper) with the 130th Territorial Defense Battalion of the 241st Territorial Defense Brigade. On June 27, 2022, he was wounded during an artillery attack near Kharkiv.

References 

Politicians from Zaporizhzhia
Leaders of political parties in Ukraine
Military personnel from Zaporizhzhia
Ukrainian military personnel of the 2022 Russian invasion of Ukraine
1987 births
Living people
Ukrainian bloggers
21st-century Ukrainian journalists